Red mahogany is a common name for several species of plants and may refer to:

 Eucalyptus resinifera, endemic to eastern Australia
 Khaya anthotheca, native to Africa